is a mountain in the Northwest Highlands of Scotland, lying north of Loch Cluanie and south of Glen Affric.

Its Gaelic name likely refers to the handlers of hunting dogs.

See also 
 List of Munro mountains
 Mountains and hills of Scotland

References

Mountains and hills of the Northwest Highlands
Marilyns of Scotland
Munros
One-thousanders of Scotland